Ostatni wojownik is the fourth studio album by the Polish heavy metal band Turbo. It was released in 1987 in Poland through Pronit. The album was recorded in May–September 1987 at Giełda studio, Poznań. The cover art was created by Jerzy Kurczak. The album was also issued as a cassette by Polton, with different cover artwork. The 2001 rerelease of Ostatni wojownik has a bonus track and a different song order.
 
The English version of the album entitled Last Warrior was released in 1988 in Germany through Noise Records. The album was recorded in March 1988 at Musiclab Studio in Germany. The cover art was created by Don Maitz, and photos by Maciej Głowaczewski.

Track listing

Personnel

 Turbo
Grzegorz Kupczyk - vocal, keyboard
Wojciech Hoffmann - guitar, backing vocal
Bogusz Rutkiewicz  - bass guitar
Andrzej Łysów - guitar, backing vocals
Tomasz Goehs - drums, backing vocals

 Production (Polish edit.)
 Zbigniew Suchański - engineer assistant
 Piotr Madziar - engineer
 Tomasz Dziubiński - producer
 Jerzy Kurczak - cover art
 Production (English edit.)
 Harris Johns - producer, engineer, mixing
 Don Maitz - cover art

Release history

References

1987 albums
Turbo (Polish band) albums
Polish-language albums
Noise Records albums